Cedar Creek (also called the Cedar River) is a tributary of the Cannonball River in southwestern North Dakota in the United States.

It rises near White Butte, south of Amidon in the badlands of Slope County. It flows ESE, north of Whetstone Butte, then east, north of the Cedar River National Grassland, forming the northern border of Sioux County and the Standing Rock Indian Reservation.

See also
 Cedar Creek Bridge (Haynes, North Dakota)
List of North Dakota rivers

References

Rivers of North Dakota
Bodies of water of Slope County, North Dakota
Bodies of water of Sioux County, North Dakota